Deh-e Torkan (also Romanized as Deh-e Torkān and Deh Torkān; also known as Tīţar Khān) is a village in Oshtorinan Rural District, Oshtorinan District, Borujerd County, Lorestan Province, Iran. At the 2006 census, its population was 1,202, in 268 families.

References 

Towns and villages in Borujerd County